This is a list of books about Wikipedia or for which Wikipedia is a major subject.

Wikipedia as primary subject

Wikipedia as major non-primary subject

Wikipedia as source material
Wikipedia is free content which anybody can edit, use, modify, and distribute. Several books have used Wikipedia as source material or as their data source while others have compiled articles for artistic, educational, or commercial purposes.

See also 
 Academic studies of Wikipedia
 List of films about Wikipedia
 For information on Wikipedia's administrative structure see Wikipedia:Administration

References

External links
 Wikilit: a literature review of scholarly research on Wikipedia
 Wikimedia research newsletter

 
Wikipedia
Lists about Wikipedia